Ham Sab Chor Hain ( We are all Thieves) is a 1995 Hindi-language action film, produced by Hiren Bafna and Sangeeta Bafna under the Shree Durga Laxmi Enterprises banner and directed by Ambrish Sanghal. It stars Dharmendra, Jeetendra, Kamal Sadanah, Ritu Shivpuri  and music composed by Bappi Lahiri.

Plot
ACP Ravi Varma & Kamal are siblings whose parents are slaughtered by 3 brutal Hunterwala, Bhothnath, and Naichand whose boss is Chakradhar, and escape from penal. Kamal wants to slay them whereas Ravi wants to arrest them and punish them through the judiciary. Vijay Kumar supplies servants to rich people as a profession and at night he turns into Robin Hood and rob's their illegal expenditure and gives it to the poor people. Ravi is appointed to arrest Robin Hood while Kamal, his lover Rithu and Ravi's lover Geeta joins Vijay's team. Vijay wants to take revenge on Chakradhar who killed his wife and send him to jail and at the climax Ravi, Vijay & Kamal joins to see the end of all the criminals.

Cast

Dharmendra as Vijay Kumar
Jeetendra as ACP Ravi Kumar D. Verma
Kamal Sadanah as Kamal D. Verma
Ritu Shivpuri as Ritu
Mohan Joshi as Chakradhar  
Puneet Issar as Bhootnath
Girja Shankar as Nainsukh 
Gajendra Chouhan as Police Commissioner  
Aasif Sheikh as Rajrani  
Ram Mohan as Vishwakarma  
Vikas Anand as Inspector Dinanath Verma
Tiku Talsania as Mantri  
Ram Sethi as Peter
Birbal as Bajrangi
Yunus Parvez    
Sujata Mehta as Rashmi
Reema Lagoo as Ritu's mom
Upasna Singh as Sonia     
Aparajita as Mrs. D. Verma
Shraddha Verma

Soundtrack
The music of the film was composed by Bappi Lahiri, and all songs are written by Nawab Arzoo. Notable singers Kumar Sanu, Udit Narayan, Abhijeet, Vinod Rathod, Sadhana Sargam, Kavita Krishnamurthy, Alka Yagnik, Ila Arun, Sapna Mukherjee and Arun Bakshi rendered their voices in this album.

References

External links

1990s Hindi-language films
1995 films
Films scored by Bappi Lahiri
Cross-dressing in Indian films